Henry Eppes (September 16, 1830 or 1831 – February 6, 1903) was a seven-term Republican senator in the North Carolina General Assembly between 1868 and 1900. He was one of about 111 African Americans to serve in North Carolina's state legislature between 1868 to 1900 and one of the few who served during and after reconstruction. Because of Jim Crow Laws, no African American followed Eppes in the North Carolina legislature until 1968 when civil rights were restored. Eppes also served as a delegate for Halifax County to North Carolina's 1868 Constitutional Convention.

Early life 
Eppes was born enslaved in Halifax County, North Carolina on September 16, 1830. Halifax County was part of North Carolina's "black belt", where the African American population outnumbered the white population. The county was also infamous as a "hotspot for criminal violence against former slaves."

Eppes did not have a formal education but taught himself to read and write.

Career 
After the Civil War, Eppes worked as a registrar for the Freedman's Bureau and attended the State Equal Rights League Convention of Freedmen in 1866. He also worked as a brick mason and plasterer. In 1867, the North Carolina Republicans selected Eppes to be a statewide campaign speaker. Through a recommendation of the Freedman's Bureau, Eppes was a delegate for Halifax County in North Carolina's Constitutional Convention in 1868.

Also in 1867, the Union military government appointed Eppes to work as a registrar. He was also appointed to be a justice of the peace for Halifax County in 1869.

Eppes was elected to the North Carolina Senate for the term beginning 1868, representing Halifax County. He was re-elected for two additional terms ending in 1874; he was not reelected for a fourth term, but regained his seat in 1880 and continued to serve until 1887. He served on the Committee on Agriculture, the Committee on Corporations, the Committee on Military Affairs, the Committee on Privileges and Elections, the Committee on Propositions and Grievances, and the Special Committee on Roads. He also served on the Committee for the Selection of a New Penitentiary Location, selecting a site in Raleigh in 1869.

Eppes' legislation supported the rights of African Americans. In March 1869, he proposed legislation for equal access to public conveyances; however, his bill did not pass. In 1870, Eppes supported the successful militia bill to stop the Ku Klux Klan violence against African Americans. In 1887, he unsuccessfully proposed legislation for the establishment of a statewide normal and collegiate institution for African American students.

He was a delegate at the 1872 Republican Party National Convention held in Philadelphia, nominating Ulysses S. Grant to a second term as president. He was the first 

After retiring from politics, he invested in real estate in Halifax County and Wilmington, North Carolina. In 1889, he and other black leaders formed the  People’s Perpetual Building and Loan Association which empowered its shareholders to purchase homes by giving them access to loans. However, his fortunes took a turn for the worse after the 1898 Wilmington massacre. By the time of his death, Eppes' real estate ventures left him "deeply in debt".

Legacy and honors 
Eppes and other African American politicians who served between 1868 and 1900 were recognized by a 2013 Senate Joint Resolution by the North Carolina General Assembly.

Personal life 
Eppes was married to Lavinia Knight of Halifax County while they were both enslaved. The couple had thirteen children; seven survived to adulthood. Educator Charles Montgomery Eppes, for whom the C. M. Eppes school in Greenville is named, was one of his sons.

Eppes was an elder and minister in the African Methodist Episcopal Church. He served as a pastor at the St. Paul A. M. E. Church in Raleigh. He also was a delegate to the Methodist General Conference in Atlanta, Georgia and Baltimore, Maryland.

Eppes died on January 23, 1903, in Halifax, County. He was buried in Halifax on January 29, 1903.

See also
African-American officeholders during and following the Reconstruction era

References

African-American politicians during the Reconstruction Era
1910s deaths
1830s births
1900s deaths
People from Halifax County, North Carolina
Republican Party North Carolina state senators
African-American state legislators in North Carolina
African Methodist Episcopal Church clergy
American justices of the peace
19th-century American Methodist ministers
Methodists from North Carolina
American freedmen